Protected areas of the European Union are areas which need and/or receive special protection because of their environmental, cultural or historical value to the member states of the European Union.

NATURA 2000
Special Area of Conservation (SAC)
Special Protection Area (SPA)

See also
 Protected area
 Conservation designation
 Specially Protected Areas of Mediterranean Importance

References

European Union and the environment
Cultural policies of the European Union
European Union
Protected areas of Europe